Dobra Kolata is a mountain in the Kolata massif located in Albania and Montenegro, part of the Prokletije mountain range, standing at  high.

Description
The highest peak is completely on Albanian territory and called Rodi e Kollatës, it rises . Kolata is the second highest peak in Montenegro after its neighbour Zla Kolata.

References

Mountains of Albania
Mountains of Montenegro
Accursed Mountains